Atrapada may refer to:
 Atrapada (1991 TV series)
 Atrapada (2018 TV series)